Rhombichiton is a genus of polyplacophoran mollusc.  Some consider it to be synonymous with Pterochiton.

References 

Chiton genera